Green Pond is an unincorporated community in Bibb County, Alabama, United States, located  northeast of Woodstock. Green Pond has a post office with ZIP code 35074, which opened on May 22, 1872.

References

Unincorporated communities in Bibb County, Alabama
Unincorporated communities in Alabama